Comox—Powell River was a federal electoral district in British Columbia, Canada, that was  represented in the House of Commons of Canada from 1979 to 1988.

This riding was created in 1976 from parts of Coast Chilcotin, Comox–Alberni and Skeena ridings.

It was abolished in 1987 when it was redistributed into Comox—Alberni and North Island—Powell River ridings.

It consisted of
 the Mount Waddington Regional District;
 the Powell River Regional District, except Lasqueti Island and the adjacent smaller islands;
 the Comox–Strathcona Regional District;
 the Central Coast Regional District;
 the southern part of the Kitimat-Stikine Regional District, i.e., the part lying south of a line drawn from east to west along Finlayson Channel, Sarah Passage, Tolmie Channel, Meyers Passage and Laredo Sound; and
 the Sunshine Coast Regional District.

Members of Parliament

Election results

See also 

 List of Canadian federal electoral districts
 Past Canadian electoral districts

External links
Riding history from the Library of Parliament

Defunct British Columbia federal electoral districts on Vancouver Island